The Nautilus is a peer-reviewed scientific journal covering research in malacology. Hence its scope includes all aspects of the biology, ecology, and systematics of mollusks.

The first two volumes were published by shell trader William D. Averell (1853-1928) under the name The Conchologists’ Exchange. From 1958 to 1972, the subtitle of The Nautilus was "The Pilsbry Quarterly devoted to the Interests of Conchologists".

Since 1999, its publication is partly sponsored by Florida's Division of Cultural Affairs and the National Endowment for the Arts since 2002.

Abstracting and indexing 
The journal is abstracted and indexed by Aquatic Sciences and Fisheries Abstracts, Biological Abstracts, BIOSIS Previews, Current Contents,  Science Citation Index, and The Zoological Record. According to the Journal Citation Reports, its 2019 impact factor is 1.00.

Name
The name of the journal is taken from the common name and scientific name of the shelled cephalopod, the nautilus.

Editors 
Editors of The Nautilus included notable malacologists:
 William D. Averell (1853–1928), editor and business manager (1886–1889)
 Charles Willison Johnson (1863–1932), business manager (1890–1932)
 Henry Augustus Pilsbry (1862–1957), editor (1889–1957)
 Horace Burrington Baker (1889–1971), editor (1958–1968), business manager since 1932
 Charles B. Wurtz (1916–1982), editor since 1958
 Robert Tucker Abbott (1919–1995), editor (1968–1995)
 Myroslaw George Harasewych (born 1949), editor (1985–1998)
 José H. Leal (born 1952), managing editor (1997), editor (1998–present)

References

External links 

 

Malacology journals
Publications established in 1886
English-language journals
Quarterly journals
Academic journals published by museums
Hijacked journals